Aston le Walls is a village and civil parish in West Northamptonshire, England, close by the border with Oxfordshire. Neighbouring villages are Chipping Warden, Lower Boddington Upper Boddington and Byfield. According to the 2001 census the village had a population of 334 falling to 293 at the 2011 census.

History
The villages name means 'eastern farm/settlement'. 'The Walls' refers to the local earthworks of uncertain date and provenance.

The village is listed in 1086 as being within the Hundred of Warden. By the late 1800s, the hundred had annexed nearby hundreds and been renamed the Hundred of Chipping Warden.

Buildings

The Anglican church is dedicated to St Leonard and dates from the 13th century and was restored in the 1870s.

There is a Roman Catholic church dedicated to the Sacred Heart and Our Lady dated 1827.

The Manor House is ca 1700.

Washbrook Farm, is an equestrian eventing centre.

References

External links 

Photograph of the parish church

 

Villages in Northamptonshire
West Northamptonshire District
Civil parishes in Northamptonshire